Upton is a town in Worcester County, Massachusetts, United States. It was first settled in 1728. The population was given as exactly 8,000 at the 2020 census.

For geographic and demographic information on the census-designated place Upton-West Upton, see: Upton-West Upton, Massachusetts.

History 

Upton was originally the home of the Nipmuc, who inhabited most of central Massachusetts. The town was first settled in 1728. Residents in outlying areas of surrounding towns were finding it difficult to fulfil the obligation to attend church every Sunday, so they petitioned the state for creation of a new town central to their homes, and in 1735 Upton was incorporated, taking land from Hopkinton, Mendon, Uxbridge, and Sutton.

Upton was home to a number of members of the Taft family, including an American Revolutionary War soldier named Samuel Taft, who was born there. Samuel Taft had 22 children and hosted President George Washington on his inaugural tour of New England in 1789. Three-term mayor of Worcester, historian Judge Henry Chapin was born here on May 13, 1811.

Between 1730 and 1850, Upton had many small shoe shops, called ten–footers. These operations were gradually merged into large assembly-line manufacturing companies. By 1837, Upton produced 21.7% of the boots made in Worcester County.

William Knowlton founded what was to become the world's largest women's hat factory: Knowlton Hat Factory was built in 1872 and added to the National Historic Register in 1982.

The Upton Fire Department was incorporated at Town Meeting on April 9, 1839, and has served Upton and its residents faithfully for 175 years

In 2018, the town, led by the Economic Development Committee, began the process of redeveloping its downtown area. This is expected to be a decade-long project involving a public-private partnership and anchored by a new community center.

Geography

The Northwest part of Upton, including the area surrounding Warren Brook, have become known as Forest Green by locals due to the lush rolling hills that can be seen from Fowler Street and Mechanic Street.

Adjacent towns

Demographics

By the 2020 census, the population had reached 8,000. The racial makeup of the town was 86.6% White, 0.8% Black, 0% American Indian/Alaska Native, 4.2% Asian, 0.1% Native Hawaiian/Pacific Islander, 0.7% from other races, and 4.2% from two or more races. Hispanic or Latino of any race were 3.5% of the population.

As of the census of 2000, there were 5,642 people, 2,042 households, and 1,562 families residing in the town. The racial makeup of the town was 97.3% White, 0.5% African American, 0.1% Native American, 1.0% Asian, 0.3% from other races, and 0.8% from two or more races. Hispanic or Latino of any race were 0.7% of the population.

There were 2,042 households, out of which 42.1% had children under the age of 18 living with them, 67.9% were married couples living together, 6.7% had a female householder with no husband present, and 23.5% were non-families. 19.0% of all households were made up of individuals, and 7.6% had someone living alone who was 65 years of age or older.  The average household size was 2.74 and the average family size was 3.17.

In the town, the population was spread out, with 29.1% under the age of 18, 4.3% from 18 to 24, 35.0% from 25 to 44, 22.2% from 45 to 64, and 9.5% who were 65 years of age or older. The median age was 37 years. For every 100 females, there were 95.6 males. For every 100 females age 18 and over, there were 92.7 males.

The median income for a household in the town was $88,595, and the median income for a family was $109,251. Males had a median income of $66,734 versus $39,224 for females. The per capita income for the town was $43,924.  About 1.8% of families and 3.5% of the population were below the poverty line, including 4.1% of those under age 18 and 4.7% of those age 65 or over.

Library
The Upton Town Library was founded in March 1871.

Education

Public schools
Memorial Elementary School and Nipmuc Regional High School are part of the public school system of the Mendon-Upton Regional School District.

Blackstone Valley Regional Vocational Technical High School is a trade school also open to the nearby towns of Northbridge, Grafton, Bellingham, Uxbridge, Millville, Sutton, Milford, Hopedale, Blackstone, Douglas and Mendon.

Government
Government is by open Town Meeting. There are three selectmen elected to three-year terms, and an appointed town manager.

Notable people

Samuel Taft, an American Revolutionary War soldier, was born in Upton; hosted President George Washington on his inaugural tour of New England in 1789.

Images

References

External links

Upton official website

Towns in Worcester County, Massachusetts
Towns in Massachusetts